The barred moray (Echidna polyzona), also known as the banded moray, the dark-banded eel, the girdled moray, the girdled reef eel, the many banded moray eel, the ringed moray, the ringed reef moray, the striped moray and the zebra eel,) is a moray eel of the family Muraenidae. It was described by John Richardson in 1845, originally under the genus Muraena. It is a marine, tropical eel which is known from the Indo-Pacific, including the Red Sea, East Africa, the Hawaiian Islands, the Marquesan Islands, the Tuamotus Islands, the Ryukyu Islands, and the Great Barrier Reef.

The barred moray's diet consists of shrimp such as Saron marmoratus, crabs, isopods, and polychaetes, which it feeds on during both day and night. It is of commercial interest to both subsistence fisheries and the aquarium trade.

References

External links
 

barred moray
Fish of China
Fish of Hawaii
Fish of the Indian Ocean
Fish of the Pacific Ocean
barred moray
Taxa named by John Richardson (naturalist)